Charles Gordon Roy Siddells (7 May 1891 – 24 December 1947) was a New Zealand professional rugby league footballer who played in the 1910s. He played at representative level for New Zealand (non-Test matches) (Heritage № 62). He predominantly played for Wanganui, but also played single matches for Wellington, Hawkes Bay, and Taranaki.

International honours
Roy Siddells was a member of the 1911 New Zealand rugby league tour of Australia during the 1911 New Zealand rugby league season. During the 1913 tour of New Zealand by New South Wales, Siddells played against the touring party for New Zealand in two matches.

Domestic representative teams
With the game in its infancy Siddells was called on to play for several representative teams despite not actually living in those provinces. In 1911 he played for Wanganui in April, Wellington on August 5, and then 2 weeks later for Hawkes Bay against Auckland. Then he played 2 further matches for Wanganui before the season ended. In 1912 he played 5 matches for Wanganui but also represented Taranaki against the touring New South Wales side on August 29.

Genealogical information
Roy Siddells married Stella Westaway in 1913.

Honoured at Petone Panthers
Although there is no indication that he ever played for them. The only match he played for Wellington rugby league was as a guest player in 1911 a week after he returned from the New Zealand tour of Australia.

References

1891 births
1947 deaths
New Zealand national rugby league team players
New Zealand rugby league players
Place of birth missing
Place of death missing
Rugby league centres
Wellington rugby league team players
Petone Panthers players
Wanganui rugby league team players
Taranaki rugby league team players